The 1922 Racine Legion season was their inaugural season in the league. The team finished 6–4–1, finishing sixth in the league.

Schedule

Standings

References

Racine Legion seasons
Racine Legion
Racine Legion
Welcome To Horlickville!
www.RacineLegion.com